Jed or JED may refer to:

Places
 Jed River, New Zealand
 Jed Water, a river in Scotland
 Jed, West Virginia, United States, an unincorporated community

People and fictional characters
 Jed (given name), a list of people and fictional characters with the given name or nickname
 Jed the Fish (born 1955), radio disc jockey Edwin Fish Gould III
 Jed Madela, stage name of Filipino recording artist and TV host John Edward Tajanlangit (born 1977)

JED
 JED, IATA code for King Abdulaziz International Airport, Jeddah, Saudi Arabia
 JED (text editor)
 Journal of Electronic Defense
 Julian Ephemeris Date, i.e. Julian date

Other uses
 , several Royal Navy ships
 Jed (album), by the Goo Goo Dolls
 Jed (wolfdog), an animal actor
 Jed, a slang term for a member of the World War II secret Operation Jedburgh; collectively the members were known as 'The Jeds'
 The Jed Foundation, a non-profit organization promoting emotional health and prevent suicide among college students